Tin-Lun "Jason" Ho (born August 12, 1951) is a Chinese-American theoretical physicist, specializing in condensed matter theory, quantum gases, and Bose-Einstein condensates. He is known for the Mermin-Ho relation.

Education and career
Ho graduated in 1972 with a B.Sc. from Chung Chi College, Chinese University of Hong Kong. He was a graduate student for the academic year 1972–1973 at the University of Minnesota and in 1973 transferred to Cornell University. There he graduated in 1977 with a Ph.D. under the supervision of N. David Mermin. Ho was a postdoc from 1977 to 1980 under the supervision of Christopher J. Pethick at the University of Illinois, from 1978 to 1980 at NORDITA, and from 1980 to 1982 at the Kavli Institute for Theoretical Physics at the University of California, Santa Barbara. At Ohio State University (OSU), he was an assistant professor from 1983 to 1989 and an associate professor from 1989 to 1996, when he became a full professor. At OSU he is since 2002 a Distinguished Professor of Mathematical and Physical Sciences. From 2007 to 2014 he was a member of the editorial board of the Journal of Low Temperature Physics.

Ho was an Alfred P. Sloan Foundation Fellow for the academic year 1984–1985 and a Fellow of the John Simon Guggenheim Memorial Foundation for the academic year 1999–2000.

In 2008 he received the Lars Onsager Prize for "his contributions to quantum liquids and dilute quantum gases, both multi-component and rapidly rotating, and for his leadership in unifying condensed matter and atomic physics research in this area."

Ho was elected in 1999 a Fellow the American Physical Society, in 2011 a Fellow of the American Association for the Advancement of Science, and in 2015 a Member of the American Academy of Arts and Sciences.

Most recently, he has been working on Bose-Einstein condensatess and optical lattices, for which he proposed a cooling mechanism in 2009.

Selected publications
  (over 650 citations)
  (over 1750 citations)
 
 
 
 
  (over 550 citations)
 
 
 
 
  (See Hubbard model.)

References

External links
 

20th-century Chinese physicists
21st-century Chinese physicists
20th-century American physicists
21st-century American  physicists
Theoretical physicists
Condensed matter physicists
Alumni of the University of Hong Kong
Cornell University alumni
Ohio State University faculty
Fellows of the American Physical Society
Fellows of the American Academy of Arts and Sciences
1951 births
Living people